A virtual girl is the creation or re-creation of a human girl in image and voice using computer-generated imagery and sound.

Virtual girl may also refer to:

 Virtual Girl, a 1993 science fiction novel
 Virtual Woman, a software program